Air Iceland Connect, formerly Flugfélag Íslands, was a regional airline with its head office at Reykjavík Airport in Reykjavík, Iceland. It operates scheduled services under the brand of its parent company, Icelandair, to domestic destinations across Iceland, Greenland and the Faroe Islands (operated by Atlantic Airways). Its main bases are Reykjavík Airport and Akureyri Airport. It is a subsidiary of Icelandair Group and merged with Icelandair in 2021, being fully absorbed into the parent company, while at the same time still operating flights under the name of its parent company.

History 
Air Iceland Connect can trace its history to 1937. On 3 June that year Flugfélag Akureyrar was established; the airline changed its name to Flugfélag Íslands on 13 March 1940, the third airline to bear this name. The first Flugfélag Íslands was founded on 22 March 1919 and dissolved the following year. A second airline of the same name was founded on 1 May 1928 and operated until 1931. In 1973, Flugfélag Íslands and Loftleiðir merged under the name Flugleiðir hf. Its domestic division was called Flugleiðir while its transatlantic division was called Icelandair.

In Akureyri, Tryggvi Helgason founded the airline Norðurflug; it was incorporated on 1 May 1995 as Flugfélag Norðurlands. Subsequently, in 1997, Norðurlands merged with Flugleiðir's domestic operation under the name Flugfélag Íslands.

In late 2011, Flugfélag Íslands acquired two Bombardier Dash 8-200 aircraft for delivery in early 2012. Upon delivery of these aircraft, the airline sold its only Dash 8–100 series aircraft. It previously operated ATR 42 aircraft, wet leased from Islandsflug, from 2000 to 2003. A fleet of three Bombardier Dash 8-Q400 aircraft replaced the airline's five Fokker 50 aircraft in 2015–16. Services using the new aircraft included routes to Aberdeen which started in March 2016, and Belfast which began in June 2017, both flown out of Keflavík International Airport.

In May 2017, Flugfélag Íslands announced it had rebranded as Air Iceland Connect. Árni Gunnarsson, managing director of Air Iceland Connect, stated that the name change would help distinguish themselves from Icelandair and signify the airline's connection to Icelandic and international destinations. Dropping the Icelandic name resulted in complaints about the attack on the Icelandic language.

In February 2018, Air Iceland Connect announced a strategy change by focusing on regional destinations. Therefore, flights to the United Kingdom had been cut by 14 May 2018 and the Bombardier Dash 8 Q400s will be phased out.

On 9 March 2021, Icelandair Group announced that Air Iceland Connect is to merge its sales operations with Icelandair by uniting domestic and international services from 16 March 2021 and continuing the current flight operations under the Icelandair brand. The company Air Iceland Connect continues to operate domestic flights under its own legal responsibility but using the Icelandair brand.

Destinations 

Air Iceland Connect operated to the following destinations under its own name, before its operations were integrated with Icelandair's in March 2021.

Codeshare agreements
Air Iceland Connect had codeshare agreements on flights to the Faroe Islands operated by Atlantic Airways, as well as on services to Grímsey, Thorshofn, Vopnafjörður and Nerlerit Inaat Airport operated by Norlandair.

Fleet 

, the Air Iceland Connect fleet consisted of the following aircraft, all of which now operate the same flights under the Icelandair brand: 

The Q200 is the only aircraft type possessed by Air Iceland Connect compatible with such runways. Its retired fleet includes Fokker 50s.

Accidents and incidents
 On 14 April 1942, Flugfélag Íslands Smyrill crashed shortly after takeoff from Reykjavík Airport, killing merchant and former athlete Axel Kristjánsson and an officer from the British occupation force in Iceland, while injuring two others.
 On 29 May 1947, a Flugfélag Íslands Douglas DC-3 with registration TF-ISI crashed at Héðinsfjörður, Iceland, in bad weather, killing all 25 on board. As of 2018 this is the worst aircraft accident to occur in Iceland.
On 26 September 1970, Flugfélag Íslands Flight 704, a Fokker F27 Friendship, with registration TF-FIL, crashed into the mountains of Mykines in the Faroe Islands, in heavy fog, killing the Icelandic captain and 7 Faroese passengers. 26 passenger and crew survived the crash. Three passengers, who escaped with minor injuries, hiked for an hour down the mountain to the village of Mykines, alerting authorities. The majority of the villagers went up the mountain to aid the injured.
On 18 June 1980, Flugleiðir's Fokker F27 Friendship, with 19 people on board, made an emergency landing on Keflavík Airport after its landing gear failed to come down on its approach to Vestmannaeyjar. The pilots managed to lower two of the plane's three landing gears and successfully land the plane in Keflavík with minimal damage to the plane.
 On 20 March 1982, the left engine of Flugleiðir's Fokker F27 Friendship, with registration TL-FLM, blew up during takeoff from Ísafjörður Airport, at the altitude of 490 feet. The pilots managed to put out the fire but could not lower the left landing gear due to the damage it sustained in the explosion. Instead of trying to land on the narrow Ísafjörður airport with only two wheels down, the captain decided to fly about 230 km to the much larger Keflavík Airport to attempt an emergency landing there. Despite the front part of the engine almost breaking of in the explosion, the plane managed to land in Keflavík with minimal additional damage to the plane. All 25 people on board survived without injuries.
 On 11 March 1986, the pilots of a Flugleiðir Fokker F27 Friendship, with registration TL-FLO, aborted takeoff from Reykjavík Airport after hearing unusual noise coming from the plane but were unable to stop it before it reached the end of the runway due to wet conditions. The plane went off the end of the runway, hit a concrete ditch which resulted in the front landing gear breaking off, went through a fence at the edge of the runway and came to a halt on the middle of the Suðurgata, a busy traffic street, barely missing a large oil truck that had just passed by. All 45 people on board escaped without injuries.
On 8 July 1986, a privately owned single engine Socata Rallye Tampico crashed during takeoff from Reykjavík Airport, slid into Flugleiðir's Fokker F27 Friendship, with registration TF-FLM, and caught fire. The Fokker was deboarding at the time and a stewardess managed to push three passengers out of the way just before the Tampico hit. The flight engineer of the Fokker had grabbed a fire extinguisher when he saw the plane crash and managed to contain the fire before another employee of Flugleiðir came with a second extinguisher and helped him put the fire out before it could reach the fuel gushing out of the damaged airplane. All four people on board the small plane were pulled out with minor injuries.
 On 4 March 2011, a de Havilland Canada Dash 8-100 registered TF-JMB was hit by a microburst while landing at Nuuk Airport in Greenland. It touched down hard and the right main landing gear collapsed. The aircraft veered off the runway, tearing the nose landing gear off. The 31 people on board were unharmed, however, the aircraft was written off.

References

External links

Official website

Defunct airlines of Iceland
Airlines established in 1997
European Regions Airline Association
1997 establishments in Iceland
Icelandair
Icelandic brands